Trap–neuter–return (TNR), also known as trap–neuter–release, is a controversial method that attempts to manage populations of feral cats. The process involves live-trapping the cats, having them neutered, ear-tipped for identification, and, if possible, vaccinated, then releasing them back into the outdoors. If the location is deemed unsafe or otherwise inappropriate, the cats may be relocated to other appropriate areas (barn/farmyard homes are often considered best). Ideally, friendly adults and kittens young enough to be easily socialized are retained and placed for adoption. Feral cats cannot be socialized, shun most human interaction and do not fare well in confinement, so they are not retained. Cats suffering from severe medical problems such as terminal, contagious, or untreatable illnesses or injuries are often euthanized.

In the past, the main goal of most TNR programs was the reduction or eventual elimination of free-roaming cat populations. It is still the most widely implemented non-lethal method of managing them. While that is still a primary goal of many efforts, other programs and initiatives may be aimed more towards providing a better quality of life for feral cats, stemming the population expansion that is a direct result of breeding, improving the communities in which these cats are found, reducing "kill" rates at shelters that accept captured free-roaming cats, in turn improving public perceptions and possibly reducing costs, and eliminating or reducing nuisance behaviors to decrease public complaints about free-roaming cats.

Scientific research has not found TNR to be an effective means of controlling the feral cat population. Literature reviews have found that when studies documented TNR colonies that declined in population, those declines were being driven primarily by substantial percentages of colony cats being permanently removed by a combination of rehoming and euthanasia on an ongoing basis, as well as by an unusually high rate of death and disappearance. TNR colonies often increase in population because cats breed quickly and the trapping and sterilization rates are frequently too low to stop this population growth, because food is usually being provided to the cats, and because public awareness of a TNR colony tends to encourage people in the surrounding community to dump their own unwanted pet cats there. The growing popularity of TNR, even near areas of particular ecological sensitivity, has been attributed in part to a lack of public interest regarding the environmental harm caused by feral cats, and the unwillingness of both scientific communities and TNR advocates to engage.

Terminology 

TNR usually stands for trap–neuter–return. It is sometimes described as trap–neuter–release. The word "return" emphasizes that most feral cats are returned to their original locations under such a program. Variant acronyms and terms include: TNSR (for trap–neuter/spay–return), TNVR (trap–neuter–vaccinate–return), TNRM (trap–neuter–release–maintain or manage) where "maintain" generally means caregivers feed and monitor the feral cats after they are returned to their territories, and TTVAR (trap–test–vaccinate–alter–release).

TVHR (trap–vasectomize/hysterectomize–release) refers to a different method of cat population management, despite its similar name. TVHR differs in the type of sterilization surgery performed on the cats. Unlike traditional spays (ovariohysterectomy) and neuters (castration), which are done in TNR, the vasectomies and hysterectomies in TVHR result in sterile but sexually active cats.

RTF (return to field) or TNS (trap, neuter, shelter return) are alternative approaches that simply focus on the trap and desex portion and do not include a colony management aspect. In some instances, a receiving shelter will return a cat to where it was found; in other cases shelters are completely bypassed – a person takes a free-roaming live-trapped cat in for desexing, then returns it to where it was found.

Advocacy and opposition

TNR as a method of managing free-roaming cat populations is controversial. Global attitudes towards these cats vary from those who see them as pets to those who target them as invasive species that need to be eliminated. Many international, national, and regional organizations and association, both professional and advocacy-based, have publicly aligned themselves into three basic groups: those that stridently oppose managing, maintaining, or tolerating free-roaming cats and hence TNR; those who conditionally support TNR as a part of a community cat management program (which includes community cat oversight and monitoring); and those who unconditionally support and endorse TNR.

Some organizations that conditionally support TNR include:

 The American Society for the Prevention of Cruelty to Animals: "The ASPCA endorses Trap-Neuter-Return (TNR) as the only proven humane and effective method to manage community cat colonies." It clarifies its position by stating that managing "involves a colony caretaker who provides food and adequate shelter and monitors the cats' health."
 The Humane Society of the United States (HSUS): "we support Trap-Neuter-Return (TNR) and similar sterilization programs, legislation that allows for and supports non-lethal population control, and coalition-based approaches that involve community leaders, citizens, and stakeholders to implement effective community cat management programs." They further clarify this view by stating: "The HSUS believes that the humane reduction and eventual elimination of unowned cat populations should be the end goal for all TNR participants and supporters. TNR should be considered a humane means to an end, not a method of permanently maintaining outdoor cat populations.
 The American Humane Association: "In some situations, safe cat colonies can be maintained by caretakers. American Humane Association supports trap, neuter and release programs for colony cats – especially for feral cats. Whenever possible, homes should be found for colony cats that might be successfully socialized."
 The UK's Royal Society for the Prevention of Cruelty to Animals (RSPCA): For feral cats "supports Trap, Neuter and Release (TNR) programmes with veterinary support. Healthy cats should be neutered, ear-tipped and returned or, where appropriate, re-sited."

Organizations that oppose TNR on the basis of animal welfare and wildlife preservation include:

 PETA: PETA does not endorse TNR, citing concerns about short life expectancies, disease, accidental death, exposure, and inhumane living conditions for cats, and the wildlife deaths inflicted by feral cats. "Having witnessed firsthand the gruesome things that can happen to feral cats, we cannot in good conscience advocate trapping and releasing as a humane way to deal with overpopulation." "TNR makes humans—not cats and certainly not wildlife—feel better."
 The International Wildlife Rehabilitation Council: "The IWRC supports the humane removal of feral cat and dog populations, including feral cat colonies, through the rehabilitation and adoption of suitable animals into domestic environments and humane euthanasia of animals that cannot be rehabilitated and re-homed." They point out that as domestic animals "subsidized" by people, they exceed the ability for the environment to support them without resulting in damage to wildlife.
 The Wildlife Society: "TNR undermines the work of wildlife professionals and severely jeopardizes the integrity of native biodiversity."
 American Bird Conservancy (ABC): "Cats have been introduced into new habitats across the globe with terrible results. Outdoors, cats are a non-native and invasive species that threaten birds and other wildlife, disrupt ecosystems, and spread diseases." They advocate responsible pet ownership and "oppose Trap, Neuter, Release (TNR) for feral cats because of the persistent and severe threats posed by feral cat colonies."

Advantages and disadvantages
Various studies and arguments have been presented both in support of and in opposition to free-roaming cats and TNR.

Purported reductions in population over time 
Some long-term studies have claimed or been cited to show that TNR is effective in stopping reproduction and reducing the population over time, but the methodology, analysis and conclusions of some of these studies have been called into question. Reviews of these studies, as well as mathematical models of population growth, have shown that TNR colonies only decrease in population where cats experience very high rates of permanent removal (of at least 50% of the colony cats per year, such as by a combination of adoption and euthanasia), combined with high sterilization rates, and low rates of immigration of new cats into the colony. Unless all of these conditions are met, TNR colonies will not decrease in size over time. 

 An eleven-year study of a TNR program at the University of Central Florida achieved a population decrease of 66%, from 68 cats in 1996 (when the census was first completed after some trapping) to 23 cats in 2002. No new kittens were born after 1995, and newly arrived stray or abandoned cats were neutered or adopted to homes. However, as many proponents fail to note, TNR was not the sole reason for success. The population reduction was primarily from adoption (47%) and euthanasia (11%), or due to the cats no longer living on site with their whereabouts unknown (15%).
 A TNR program begun in 1992 by the Merrimack River Feline Rescue Society (MRFRS) on the central waterfront of Newburyport, Massachusetts, has been widely cited as an example of TNR success on a community level; however, only superficial reports about what took place have been available and there is very little statistical data to support the claims.

The success of specific focused studies to advocate TNR as a solution for controlling and reducing free-roaming cat populations worldwide is problematic. More broad-based approaches include using matrix population models to estimate the efficacy of euthanasia versus trap-neuter-return for management of free-roaming cats, such as the one researchers established for use in urban environments.

Efforts to assess the effectiveness have been hampered by the lack of sufficient monitoring data. Having some professional assistance, adapting the population monitoring framework developed over decades by wildlife biologists, and systematic monitoring can evolve into a relatively low-cost, high-value adjunct to ongoing management efforts.

The potential problem of TNR advocacy and increased public awareness of non-lethal intervention actually contributing to the increasing numbers of free-roaming pets, by enabling pet owners to make conscious decisions to illegally dump or abandon their animal without having to worry about lethal control measures, has been a contentious point. In a widely cited example of cat control by relocation (cats from Bidwell Park, California, were trapped and moved to a private sanctuary), the high visibility of the project encouraged more abandonment. In another study, to explain the ingression of cats it was found that "the high quality and visibility of the program ... may have encouraged abandonment of cats if owners believed that the cats would be well taken care of after abandonment. Abandonment may also have occurred if owners believed that cats would be better off under the care of the program rather than surrendered to a shelter where they would face the risk of euthanasia." Some of the cats that came in to the TNR colony had already been sterilized; some of these had ear-tips and some did not.

Introgression, particularly of intact cats, has been noted to be a barrier to decreasing cat populations over time through TNR efforts. It has become apparent that while the TNR process can reduce or limit the growth rate of the colony through reproduction, it may not reduce the population numbers if it is the sole method of intervention. Population reduction occurs primarily through adoptions of non-feral cats, natural death or euthanasia of sick animals, and disappearance or emigration of cats. TNR works together with these factors to reduce reproduction and thus to minimize replacement of animals lost from the colony. Other factors such as immigration of cats from surrounding areas can counteract its effect. Thus, the impact of TNR interventions on unowned cat populations can be complex, and ongoing management of colonies becomes an important component in optimizing reductions in the cat population.

The "kill" or "no-kill" debate (euthanasia) 
TNR is often presented to public officials and policymakers as a viable alternative to lethal methods with several benefits.

Reducing euthanasia numbers 
 It has been claimed that euthanasia in shelters is the leading cause of death of cats. Proponents of TNR use this "kill" statistic to promote "no-kill" tactics. However, in the USA there are no exact numbers of animals being euthanized each year. Only a few states require animal shelters to keep records about animals being euthanized, and there is no agency responsible for collecting or verifying this data. The American Society for the Prevention of Cruelty to Animals (ASPCA) has noted a marked decrease in euthanasia rates since 2011 and Humane Society of the United States reported that euthanasia of animals in shelters has been declining sharply since 1970. In addition, the reasons for euthanasia vary. Animals may be euthanized because of shelter over-crowding, for medical reasons (illness or injury), for court-mandated reasons, or because of financial/staff limitations.
 When the number of animals coming into a shelter exceeds its ability to care for, hold, or find foster placements, the facility may end up euthanizing animals. This could include even adoptable kittens or cats simply because they cannot be taken care of. A common outcome for a cat judged to be "feral" after being taken to a traditional shelter not practicing no-kill sheltering is euthanasia (humanely putting the animal to death). Feral cats do not tolerate being caged or handled and many shelters are unable to manage them without putting the animal or the staff at risk. TNR could alleviate this.
 Facilities have reported notable decreases in intakes and euthanasia since implementing TNR programs. It is not clear, however, if these decreases can be directly attributed to TNR, or to concurrent efforts to increase and implement owned pet spay-neuter programs, new initiatives of adoption campaigns where animals at risk of "kill" are transported to areas where animals for adoptions are needed, or public awareness campaigns to enhance adoption rates.

Cost savings
 Proponents of TNR claim that while neutering cats may be costly, euthanizing them costs more. However, the cost savings associated with TNR are location-specific and accurate estimates involve taking into account numerous variables including volunteer support, donations, grants, and local spay-neuter agreements for low-cost services. Cost savings fluctuate based on the type of TNR program implemented, the extent of animal control involvement, the volunteer base available, and the community's overall support of TNR. Over time, through attrition and sterilization efforts, if the free-roaming population declines, savings may be realized by total decreased expenditures on them.
 In a 10-year study in Orange County, Florida, after a feral cat sterilization program was instituted in which 7,903 feral cats neutered, the cost was an estimated $442,568, as compared to $1,098,517 if they had been impounded and euthanized.
 In Port Orange, Florida, a TNR program started in 2013 in the city's business areas resulted in fewer stray cats and money saved. In the first year, 214 cats were sterilized for $13,000, which was much less than over $50,000 spent in 2010, when most of the impounded cats were euthanized. A theoretical savings of $123,000 was projected based on not having to impound the offspring that the cats may have produced if not spayed.

Improved morale and public support
 A 2011 survey of U.S. pet owners found that 71% agreed that "Animal shelters should only be allowed to euthanize animals when they are too sick to be treated or too aggressive to be adopted," while only 25% agreed that "Sometimes animal shelters should be allowed to euthanize animals as a necessary way of controlling the population of animals."
In 2019, a study was published that concluded "for most Brisbane City (Australia) residents, when awareness is raised about the problem of urban stray cats and management strategies, the majority are supportive of a TNR community program with little or no persuasion required."
TNR programs may have a side effect of reducing the stress and strain volunteers and staff have related to euthanasia in shelters. A 2019 study concluded that euthanasia‐related strain is prevalent among shelter employees. Such strain is associated with increased levels of general job stress, work‐to‐family conflict, somatic complaints, and substance use, and with lower levels of job satisfaction.

Improving the cats' health and welfare
It has been claimed that TNR programs improve the welfare of free-roaming cats in many ways:

 Spayed female cats will no longer be burdened by pregnancy or nursing litters. Females have been found to be pregnant throughout the year. A study of the reproductive capacity of free-roaming cats showed they may have an average of 1.4 litters a year, with a median of 3 kittens/litter.
Alleviating unnecessary suffering of kittens. 75% of the kittens born to free-roaming cats being studied died or disappeared before 6 months of age. Trauma was found to be the most common cause of death.
 Improved overall heath. The American Veterinary Medical Association (AVMA) notes that properly managed programs can improve quality of life through better nutrition, vaccination to prevent disease, and euthanasia of sick and debilitated cats. However, management of colonies is not a mandated practice, nor is ongoing monitoring and follow-up care once released after the neuter-spay. Vaccinations, medical examination, care, or treatments may or may not be a part of any given TNR effort.
Fighting may decline, thus reducing injuries. A study between four colonies, two of neutered males and two of intact males, found that the frequency of agonistic behavior was lower in the neutered groups. However, the agonistic behavior that was noted in the neutered groups was attributable to interactions involving intact males who had moved into them. As noted above, introgression of cats is a common factor noted in studies.

Not all free-roaming cats are feral. Nor are all the cats that end up in live traps. Some are owned, but allowed to roam; some have escaped their homes or owners and are strays; some may have been abandoned or "dumped." Clearly, the "return" or "release" component of TNR is not in all of their best interests. The assessment, after trapping, of "social" (friendly & adoptable), "social but timid or scared" (may adjust and be adoptable), "not social" (not feral, prefers to not be handled, hard to adopt out) or "feral" is crucial if TNR is intended to be in the best interest of the animal. When programs provide for feral kittens to be socialized and adopted, and for friendly cats to be adopted, the welfare of those cats is improved.

Managed TNR programs that involve continuous active intervention on detection along with treatment and prevention of some of the more common diseases and parasites may help improve their overall health.

The overall effect of TNR on the health and welfare of free-roaming cats as a whole is not possible to measure. In numerous studies, many of the cats simply disappeared, so follow-up was impossible. They are subject to injury, illness, or death from numerous things: trauma from humans or human machines or other animals, predation by wildlife, toxins and poisons, contagious diseases, exposure to harsh weather, malnutrition, infections, and parasitic debilitation.

The TNR process itself can result in inhumane outcomes. In 2016, investigative reporting by WFLA found that in Hillsborough County, Florida, TNR cats were being returned to the outdoors the day after their surgical sterilizations, because the Tampa Bay Humane Society did not have "a place to put them for a couple of days" where they could be observed in recuperation. WFLA said they had possession of images of TNR cats bleeding from opened surgical wounds, images of TNR cat with maggots in their incisions, and an image of a bloodied cat trap whose occupant had bled out; the TV station's managers declined to allow these images to be broadcast. Officials overseeing that TNR program said that their greatly reduced shelter euthanasia rates were worth it even if their TNR outcomes "weren't perfect".

Fewer complaints
TNR may help reduce public complaints pertaining to free-roaming cats. Female cats will 'call' (come into season and be receptive to the male cat) regularly, about every three weeks during sexually active times of the year if they do not get pregnant. Having un-spayed female cats in an area will attract un-neutered males with the attendant problems of spraying, fighting and caterwauling.

 After starting a TNR program in 1995, animal control in Orange County, Florida, received fewer complaints about cats, even after broadening the definition of a nuisance complaint. 
 A study of a TNR program at Texas A&M University in 1998–2000 reported that the number of cat complaints received by the university's pest control service decreased from Year 1 to Year 2.

Effects on wildlife from hunting 

Numerous studies have shown that free-roaming cats can have a significant negative impact on native wildlife through their predation. They cause considerable wildlife destruction and ecosystem disruption, including the deaths of hundreds of millions of birds, small mammals, reptiles, amphibians, and fish. They have been linked to the extinction of 63 species and pose a threat to 360 more.

Free-roaming domestic cats are considered an "alien" species and are listed as invasive in a multitude of countries around the world.

Cats are now thought to be the single largest cause of anthropogenic bird mortality in North America.

There have been recorded instances of species extinction caused by them on islands. In 2004, targeted eradication programs had successfully removed free-roaming domestic cats from at least 49 islands. Citing eradication of invasive mammals from islands as a proven conservation tool, with clear evidence of subsequent native species recovery, it is gaining recognition as a recommended method of sustaining native biodiversity on islands.

Free-roaming cats have been documented hunting and killing prey without eating it.

Risks to human and animal health 
Stray animals in general may have significant impacts on public health due to factors such as a lack of preventive measures (e.g. vaccines, deworming), easy access to intermediate hosts (e.g. rats and birds), and unrestricted entry to public areas such as parks and playgrounds. Their presence is a major risk for the transmission of zoonotic diseases.

Free-roaming cats can act as vectors for diseases that can impact humans as well as other animals, domestic and wild. Transmissions can occur within the species and to other species. Feline leukemia virus, feline immunodeficiency virus, ectoparasites (fleas, mites, lice, ticks), intestinal and protozoan parasites, Rickettsia, and Coxiella ("Q Fever") are examples of inter and intra-species shared diseases and parasites.

There are numerous zoonotic pathogens shed in feline feces, such as Campylobacter and Salmonella spp; ascarids (e.g., Toxocara cati); hookworms (Ancylostoma spp); and the protozoan parasites Cryptosporidium spp, Giardia spp, and T. gondii. Contaminated soil is an important source of infection for humans, herbivores, rodents, and birds and several studies suggest that pet feces contribute to bacterial loading of streams and coastal waters.

Free-roaming cat populations have been identified as a source for several zoonotic diseases that can and have affected humans, including:

 Rabies
 Toxoplasmosis 
 Various nematode parasites including intestinal worms
 Plague 
 Tularemia
 Typhus
 Bacterial diseases such as cat-scratch fever (Bartonella)
 Avian Influenza A/H5N1 virus
 Fungal diseases, including sporotrichosis

Treatment by country 
Domestic cats can be found on every continent except Antarctica. Control of free-roaming dogs and cats is a worldwide problem. Beyond pragmatic and scientific considerations, cultural heritage, ethical beliefs, and social and economic impacts play critical roles in efforts to address it.

The legal status of free-roaming and community cats varies from location to location, as do the histories and efforts of TNR programs. There are numerous governments supporting trap–neuter–return. The following highlights some of the TNR issues around the world:

Australia 

In a 2017 news release in the Sydney Morning Herald, Threatened Species Commissioner Gregory Andrews reportedly summarized the reason for the federal government's intention to wipe out 2 million feral cats – about a third of the population – by saying that they are "the single biggest threat to our native animals, and have already directly driven into extinction 20 out of 30 mammals lost." This cull is planned to go until 2020.

Canada
Across Canada, municipalities are replacing old animal control bylaws with "responsible pet ownership" rules intended to direct the obligations of pet behavior to their owners. A common feature of the accelerating trend is a requirement that owners get a license for their cats and ensure they do not roam.

In January 2012, a bylaw officer in Merritt, British Columbia, removed cat food and asked the Royal Canadian Mounted Police to consider criminal charges against those feeding the community cats. No charges were laid, but the rescue group's business license was revoked and it was forced to move from its storefront location.

The City of Toronto, Ontario, includes TNR in its animal services and has a bylaw specifically addressing TNR and managed colonies. The Toronto Animal Services offers spay and neuter for colonies that are registered and have an assigned trained caretaker.

Denmark
TNR was practiced in Denmark in the mid-1970s, as reported at the 1980 Universities Federation for Animal Welfare (UFAW) symposium in London. Denmark's Society for the Protection of Cats practiced both tattooing and tipping the ear of the neutered cats to identify them.

France
In 1978, the city of Paris issued a Declaration of Rights of the Free-living Cat. In that year, Cambazard founded École du Chat and TNR'd its first cat, continuing to help thousands of cats in the following years.

Israel
Like Turkey, Israel struggles with a continually increasing population of stray cats. Cats exist in every location with people, from the southernmost city of Eilat to communities in the Golan Heights. Moreover, it is illegal in Israel to remove cats from the streets as a result of pressure from Let the Animals Live. Due to large amounts of food left by people feeding them, colonies of cats are continuing to increase, with estimates putting the population within the city of Jerusalem at 2,000 cats per square kilometer. Efforts to trap, neuter, return the cats within Israel are not working, as the population is too large to feasibly catch enough cats to make a difference. Moreover, there is no national agreement on what to do regarding the cat population. As a result their population is increasing with no future plan of action. In January 2019, from a push by people who feed the cats, Jerusalem plans to instill "feeding stations" throughout the city. The goal is to facilitate specific areas for feeding to help the populations of stray cats and to improve their welfare. This plan has been criticized by ecologists and conservationists, stating that it does nothing to help the welfare of the cats, with Amir Balaban of the Society for the Protection of Nature stating that "If someone cares about animals, they should take them home."

Italy
Killing feral cats has been illegal in the Lazio Region, which includes Rome, since 1988. A study in 2006 found almost 8,000 were neutered and reintroduced to their original colony from 1991 to 2000. It concluded that spay/neuter campaigns brought about a general decrease in cat numbers among registered colonies and censused cats, but the percentage of cat immigration (due to abandonment and spontaneous arrival) was around 21 percent. It suggested that TNR efforts without an effective education of people to control the reproduction of house cats (as a prevention for abandonment) are a waste of money, time and energy.

Since August 1991, feral cats have been protected throughout Italy when a no-kill policy was introduced for both cats and dogs. Feral cats have the right to live free and cannot be permanently removed from their colony; cat caretakers can be formally registered; and TNR methods are outlined in the national law on the management of pets.

South Korea
Negative attitudes towards cats in general and free-roaming cats in particular are culturally entrenched. The 2011 South Korean amendment of its Animal Protection Law required humane methods to be used in the transportation and euthanasia of animals. Some areas have government supported TNR programs, but these programs are often scorned by the public and poorly managed. Negative attitudes and fear towards cats in general have been slow to change and free-roaming cats may be subjected to abuse or violence. In recent years, however, South Korea's attitude toward homeless cats has improved.

New Zealand 
The Department of Conservation (DOC) is legislatively mandated to control feral cats on public conservation land. It has eradicated feral cats from several offshore islands. Control techniques include poisoning, trapping and shooting. Lethal controls follow efficient and humane best-practice techniques and adhere to the Animal Welfare Act 1999.

In 2017, the New Zealand Companion Animal Council released its National Cat Management Strategy Discussion Paper in which it advised that "when stray cat management is justified, non-lethal methods of removal (e.g. rehoming or best practice managed, targeted trap-neuter-return [mtTNR]) must always be the first option." This discussion recognized the limited value of mtTNR in some situations. Their goal is for all cats in New Zealand to be responsibly owned and that cats are humanely managed in a way that protects their welfare and the environment.

Turkey 
Turkey has a significant problem with free-roaming dogs and cats and the country is struggling with ways to manage the problem. Its Animal Protection Law prohibits killing "ownerless animals" except where permitted by the Animal Health Police Law. They are required to be taken to animal shelters established or permitted by the local authorities. In keeping with the tenents of its main religion, most Turks are very much against euthanasia of animals for "population control"; recent efforts to curb an ever-increasing population include TNR for roaming cats and dogs.

United Kingdom
The earliest documented practice of trap–neuter–return was in the 1950s, led by animal activist Ruth Plant in the UK. In the mid-1960s, former model Celia Hammond gained publicity for her TNR work "at a time when euthanasia of feral cats was considered the only option". Hammond "fought many battles with local authorities, hospitals, environmental health departments" but stated that she succeeded over the years in showing that control "could be achieved by neutering and not killing".

The first scientific conference on "the ecology and control of feral cats" was held in London in 1980 and its proceedings published by the Universities Federation for Animal Welfare (UFAW). Subsequent UFAW publications in 1982, 1990, and 1995 were the primary scientific references for feral-cat control for many years.

In 2008, the Scottish Wildcat Association began utilizing TNR of feral cats to protect the regionally endangered Scottish wildcat. Their goals include:

 Saving the genetically pure Scottish wildcat
 Removing all feral cats from the region
 Using humane, neutering-based feral cat controls
 Establishing buffer zones to prevent feral cats returning to the area

United States
There is no federal law that explicitly sets policy on feral cats, and state and local laws vary in their approaches. The Endangered Species Act and the Migratory Bird Treaty Act may be relevant to the legality of TNR. In a federal case, American Bird Conservancy v. Harvey (2014), conservationists sued Rose Harvey, the Commissioner of New York State Parks, under the Endangered Species Act for failing to prohibit TNR activities in a state park where the Piping Plover, a threatened species, was known to nest. Under a settlement and judicial order, the State of New York agreed to remove all of the cats to a shelter, and to trap and permanently remove any cats found in the park in the future.

There are legal theories that TNR programs may have liability under the Migratory Bird Treaty Act of 1918, a strict liability statute that states that "it shall be unlawful at any time, by any means or in any manner, to pursue, hunt, take, capture, kill, attempt to take, capture, or kill,....any migratory bird, any part, nest, or egg of any such bird," including unintentional taking, except if otherwise regulated or permitted by the government, and provides for criminal penalties of up to $15,000 in fines and up to six months of incarceration for each bird unlawfully taken. (An example of a successful prosecution under the MBTA was United States v. Moon Lake Electric Association Incorporated; in that case a power company was found guilty and sentenced to fines and probation because birds were being electrocuted on power poles that it owned.) Because TNR colonies are supported by people, it is possible that predation of birds by TNR cats might be ruled an illegal intentional take by the courts. 

On January 29, 2019, the Hawaii Invasive Species Council adopted a resolution supporting the keeping of pet cats indoors and the use of peer-reviewed science in pursuing humane mitigation of the impacts of feral cats on wildlife and people.

TNR of cats is illegal in Alaska, owing to a law against the release of cats into the wild, even if they were originally captured there. This has left trap-and-kill the only legal method of controlling the feral cat population there, however the law against TNR is not well enforced and there are proposals to exempt sterilized cats from the rules.

Governments have been sued to try to block their TNR efforts. In December, 2010, an injunction was granted to prevent a planned TNR program of the City of Los Angeles until an environmental review was completed under the California Environmental Quality Act. The judge did not rule on any environmental issues, or prohibit other organizations from doing TNR in the city.

Some caretakers have been prosecuted for taking care of feral cats. The perplexing issues of where a "feral" cat fits in local ordinance depends on the consideration as to whether they are pets or wildlife and whether they are "owned" or not. Many ordinances restrict feeding of wildlife (excluding birds). Then there are ordinances that restrict how many pets a person may own, and those that disallow free-roaming pets. In 2011, charges against Danni Joshua of Vandercook Lake, Michigan, for "allowing animals to run loose" were dismissed when she agreed to have her colony of 15–20 cats relocated. In 2012, 78-year-old Dawn Summers was sentenced to community service for 'hoarding"; she was feeding up to 27 community cats within a managed colony in a city-sanctioned program in Biloxi, Mississippi. Alley Cat Allies criticized the decision, stating that the community cats should not have been considered owned by the caregiver. The Virginia Supreme Court found a zoning ordinance too broad in 2013, when Henrico County charged Susan Mills for caring for feral cats, which the county said was not a permitted activity under the zoning. A circuit court judge had ordered her to stop feeding the cats, but that part of the decision was not enforceable. 
 
Opponents of feral cats have also been prosecuted for violating animal-protection laws by trying to harm or kill the animals. In 2007, Jim Stevenson stood trial for shooting a cat from a colony in Galveston County, Texas, which he reportedly did after observing the colony cats hunting endangered piping plovers in the area. The trial resulted in a hung jury because of a gap in the law stating that ownership of the animal had to be proven, an issue that has since been resolved. In December 2011, wildlife biologist Nico Dauphiné received a suspended sentence for attempting to kill feral cats with rat poison in Washington, DC.

See also
 Overpopulation in domestic animals
 Spaying and neutering
 Wildlife contraceptive

References

Further reading
Free Ranging and Feral Cats. US Department of Agriculture Wildlife Damage Management Technical Series
 
An Examination of an Iconic Trap-Neuter-Return Program: The Newburyport, Massachusetts Case Study
The Cat Conundrum. Tens of millions of free-roaming felines take a huge toll on wildlife; what to do about them has spawned battles from coast to coast
ICAM - Humane Cat Population Management Guidelines International Companion Animal Management Coalition.Includes a wide range of solutions, including TNR, to surgical and non-surgical sterilization, and lethal methods; outlines a five-stage program.
Guide to Trap-Neuter-Return (TNR) and Colony Care from Alley Cat Allies, the ASPCA and the Mayor’s Alliance for NYC’s Animals
 Criticism of TNR, and advocacy of "a movement to overcome local and national challenges caused by free-roaming cats".
The Outdoor Cat: Science and Policy from a Global Perspective, December 3-4, 2012, Marina del Rey, California

Animal welfare
Feral cats